Carl George Berger (June 29, 1901 in Wynnewood, Oklahoma – December 18, 1983 in Los Angeles, California) was a cinematographer who photographed Frank Buck’s film Bring 'Em Back Alive (1932).

Early years
Berger was born in Oklahoma, had two years of high school according to the 1940 US Census, lived in New York, and went to work for Hollywood in the late 1920s. Van Beuren Studios hired him to photograph Bring 'Em Back Alive (1932) with Frank Buck.

Later career
Berger photographed another jungle picture, Booloo, for director Clyde E. Elliott.

References

External links
 

1901 births
1983 deaths
American cinematographers
People from Wynnewood, Oklahoma